Hayen Palacios (born 8 September 1999) is a Colombian football player who plays as forward for Atlético Nacional in Categoría Primera A.

References

1999 births
Living people
Colombian footballers
Categoría Primera A players
Atlético Nacional footballers
Association football forwards
Footballers from Medellín